On 2 September 1861, near Kentish Town station in London, 16 people were killed and 317 were injured when an excursion train operated by the North London Railway collided with a freight train operated by the London and North Western Railway. 

The excursion train was running early and had been given permission to proceed, but met the freight train as it crossed the lines at a freight sidings unprotected by signals.

References

Railway accidents and incidents in London
Railway accidents in 1861
1861 in London
History of rail transport in London
History of the London Borough of Camden
Rail accident
Accidents and incidents involving North London Railway
Accidents and incidents involving London and North Western Railway
September 1861 events
Train collisions in England
Railway accidents caused by signaller's error
1861 disasters in the United Kingdom